The British Rail Class 73 is a British electro-diesel locomotive. The type is unusual in that it can operate from the Southern Region's 650/750 V DC third-rail or an on-board diesel engine to allow it to operate on non-electrified routes. This makes it very versatile, although the diesel engine produces less power than is available from the third-rail supply so the locomotives are rarely operated outside of the former Southern Region of British Rail. Following the withdrawal and scrapping of the more powerful Class 74 electro-diesels in 1977, the Class 73 was unique on the British railway network until the introduction of the Class 88 electro-diesels in 2017. Ten locomotives have been scrapped.

History 

The Southern Railway's expanding third rail electric passenger network (which had begun as far back as 1915) was until 1941 a purely passenger electric multiple unit (EMU) system. This was because it was necessary to have gaps in the third rail for level crossings, etc., which effectively prevented the use of electric locomotives on either passenger or freight. It was not until the arrival of Oliver Bulleid as Chief Mechanical Engineer of the Southern Railway, in 1937, that the problem was finally addressed when he teamed up with Alfred Raworth, the Chief Electrical Engineer, to solve the issue. To overcome the problem of gaps in the third rail three experimental locomotives were built (which later became the British Rail Class 70) which were fitted with large flywheels that maintained momentum long enough to avoid stalling in gaps. The second problem for freight train operation by electric locomotives was the serious hazard that would result if the 750 V DC third rail was laid in goods yards, as this would not only be a danger to personnel on the ground but also present some complex issues loading and unloading many types of freight wagons. The initial solution was to install simple tramway-type overhead wires to carry the 750 V supply in certain yards and add a pantograph on the locomotive roofs.

As a continuation of the Southern Railway's policy of electrification, British Railways then began electrifying the main lines to the Kent Coast as part of the 1955 Modernisation Plan. In addition to the few hundred new EMUs required, a small fleet of 25 Bo-Bo electric locomotives of  classed type "HA" (later Class 71) were built to deal with freight, parcels, and the few remaining locomotive-hauled passenger trains in Kent, such as the "Night Ferry" and "Golden Arrow" services. These locomotives also had a flywheel and pantograph, and were able to work in the more important freight yards across Kent that were fitted with the simple 750 V overhead wire system. This system was brought into use across Kent between 1959 and 1961.

Although successful this system did require considerable extra cost, and maintenance, and still limited freight operations with the new locomotives to those goods yards fitted with the catenary. Something more versatile was needed. Development and advances in both electric locomotive and diesel engine design in the early 1960s resulted in the Southern Region engineers beginning to consider the possibility of a combined electric and diesel locomotive. The requirement was for an electric locomotive with a similar power when using the electrified third rail to the already successful Type 3 Birmingham Railway Carriage and Wagon (BRCW) built diesel locomotives (later Class 33) then entering service on the Southern. This would be supported by adding a small diesel, engine powerful enough to move reasonable freight loads at slow speed within goods yards. The new locomotive design would also need retractable third rail pick up shoes. This was for two reasons: the first was safety in connection with track relaying jobs, avoiding the problem of bridging a gap and energising a dead section of third rail, and electrocuting track workers who might be in contact with the dead third rail section. The second was to allow locomotives under diesel power to move off and back onto third rail areas without risk of damaging "fixed" third rail pick up shoes.

The Southern Region engineers, having done all the initial design work, set about building a prototype batch of six new "electro-diesel" locomotives at Eastleigh Carriage and Wagon Works during 1961–2. The new locomotives had a respectable 1,600 hp on electric power, and an English Electric 600 hp diesel engine similar to those used in the Southern Region's diesel electric multiple Unit (DEMU) fleet. To improve versatility yet further, the locomotives were designed so that they could work in multiple with most of the Southern's electric and diesel multiple unit fleets as well as normal carriages and wagons. This meant the locomotives had to also be fitted with drop buckeye couplings and therefore the Pullman rubbing bar, and retractable buffers. The success of these prototype locomotives resulted in British Railways ordering a production batch of a further 43 locomotives from English Electric at the Vulcan Foundry in Newton-le-Willows. However minor technical differences prevented the prototypes (classified type "JA") working in multiple with the production examples (classified type "JB"). In all other respects, the new "electro-diesels" proved extremely versatile, to the point where many are still in service after a life of over  years.

Accidents and incidents 
 On 8 January 1972, locomotive E6027 collided with 4-BEP no 7004 at Horsham, injuring 15.
Twelve people were injured.
The severely damaged locomotive was withdrawn and subsequently scrapped. Locomotive 73 006 was hauling the parcels train that was run into.

Description 

This class of 49 locomotives were built in two batches using English Electric components. The first six locomotives were built by BR at Eastleigh Carriage and Wagon Works and introduced to service during 1962; they were built to the Hastings Line gauge, numbered E6001-E6006 and classified as type JA. With the introduction of TOPS in 1968 they were to have been classified as Class 72, to differentiate from the later built units. However, instead they became Class 73/0. In the early 1970s the locomotives were renumbered 73001-73006.

Following successful trials of the initial locomotives, a production run of 43 locomotives were ordered as part of the Bournemouth Electrification and built by English Electric at their Vulcan Foundry between 1965 and 1967. They were initially classified as Class JB and numbered E6007-E6049. They differed slightly from the six earlier machines, most notably having an increased tractive effort as well as a higher maximum speed (90 mph as opposed to 80). Following the introduction of TOPS, they became Class 73/1 and were renumbered 73101-73142. One locomotive, E6027, had already been withdrawn following accident damage and so was not renumbered. Further changes were the use of large round Oleo buffers with a pneumatic withdrawal mechanism rather than the traditional coach style (oval) saddle buffer which relied on a pin and spring mechanism. As the JA examples came in for overhaul over the years, the saddle buffers were also replaced making visual identification of the differing machines almost impossible from a distance.

From new, all members of the class were fitted with the Pullman style rubbing plate between the buffers allowing them to close couple with Southern Region electro-pneumatically controlled electric multiple units and diesel electric multiple units for push-pull train operation – the reason for retractable buffers.

Being built to the Hastings Line gauge, the locomotives were able to be used on all routes of BR's Southern Region network.

Technical details 
The design parameter of the Class 73 was to provide a secondary main line electric locomotive to the then Southern Regions "mixed traffic" requirements, with the added ability to deliver, shunt and collect freight to and from yards adjoining the electrified network under diesel power. The shunting requirement meant these locomotives had dual controls on both sides of the cab.

The limitations of a 1,600 hp electric locomotive meant that it was only capable of hauling maximum ten-coach trains to the proposed post-steam era Southern Region express timings, as were the similarly powered Type 3 BRCW Class 33 diesel locos with 1,550 hp. Southern express electric multiple units had, by comparison, at least 1,000 hp per four-car unit. To assume that the Class 73 was suitable to haul passenger or freight trains away from the electrified network with just a 600 hp diesel engine would be unrealistic. In fact the use of the slightly more powerful Class 74 electro-diesels, with 650 hp on diesel, to haul parcels trains up Poole Bank and work freight trains around the West London Line to Acton, Brent and Willesden, resulted in repeated failures; this was, therefore, a major contributory factor to that class's early demise.

There were eight third rail collector shoes on the Class 73 – four per bogie with two each side. These shoes were of the retractable type – a necessity for both safety and operational reasons, as described above. They could cope with all the then (1965) voltages of 660V and 750V as well as the 800V of the Bournemouth electrification beyond Pirbright Junction south of Woking (from autumn 1966). 660V was phased out in line with pre-BR type electric multiple unit (EMU) withdrawals, the last EMUs incapable of working in passenger service on anything greater than 660V being the 4SUB Bulleid design. Thus all BR post-1951 EMU designs could cope with 750V or 800V.

Gaps in the third rail at complex pointwork or level crossings mean that a short electric locomotive such as Class 73 is liable to momentarily lose power when passing over. This results in noticeable arcing if the driver does not shut off power. However, this rarely affects the locomotives, except to burn out the carbon brush pick-up shoes more quickly. The issue of arcing only became a problem when some of these locomotives were altered to work "Gatwick Express" services using modified Mark 2 coaching stock and 500 hp Gatwick Luggage Vans (GLVs), as 750V power jumpers between locos or units were banned on BR designs (the last EMUs to have such jumpers were the Bulleid designed 4SUBs). The Class 73s therefore could not benefit from the pick-up shoes at the opposite end of the train on the GLV. As a result of removing the last bank of resistance on the Class 73 locos to make these trains accelerate more quickly, arcing increased. Therefore, to reduce damage to other electrical equipment from the increased arcing, these particular locomotives had "flash guards" fitted on their bogies around the shoes. Stories of Class 73s catching fire were greatly exaggerated (as with the Bulleid Pacific steam locos before them).

The Class 73 locomotives were very versatile, with dual cab controls; three brake systems (vacuum, air and EPB) as detailed below; a well-designed cab with good sighting that aided shunting; the ability to work fitted freight (fully braked) and unfitted freight (no train brakes) as well as locomotive-hauled coaching stock; the ability to work in multiple with blue star coded diesel locomotives; and the ability to operate in multiple with the Southern's diesel electric multiple unit fleet (Class 73/0) or its electric multiple unit fleet (Class 73/1). The Southern Region quickly learnt to appreciate these useful and capable locomotives.

Power supply 

Unlike the previous Southern Region Class 70 and Class 71 electric locomotives, these did not have a booster to maintain traction power over gaps in the conductor rail. However, they could move forward onto an electrified section under diesel power.

Diesel engine and generator 

The  English Electric 4SRKT Mk II diesel engine was less powerful, but more reliable than the  Paxman 6YJXL fitted to the later
Class 74 electro-diesel locomotives.

Traction control 

The Class 73 was fitted with two separate power controllers on the driver's desk (and replicated on the secondman's side); one for electric or auxiliary power (under diesel power) and the other only for diesel power. The auxiliary power arrangement was to accommodate diesel operation when being driven from mainline EMU stock.

Multiple working 
Multiple working is when two or more locomotives are coupled together and controlled by a driver in the leading driving position. This was achieved with the aid of the standard SR 27-wire jumper connection system, a design that ensured excellent compatibility. They could work with other 33/1, 71, 74, locomotives (in fact any type 2,3 or 4 blue-star coded mainline locomotive) and EP multiple unit stock.

In order for the Class 73s to achieve their maximum versatility, the locomotives also had to have multiple brake systems. When built in the 1960s, this required vacuum brakes for use with freight, most locomotive-hauled carriages, and many other locomotives, including steam; also air brakes for use with the newest BR-designed wagons, and newer types of passenger carriages and locomotives; and, for use with the Southern's electric and diesel multiple unit fleets, the Electro Pneumatic Brake (EPB).

Class 73/9 variants have been fitted with the AAR system, allowing for multiple working with Classes 59, 66 & 67.

Couplings 

The Class 73s also have two couplings; a rigid semi-automatic type known as the "buckeye", needed for coupling to most types of coaching stock, and the then-BR(SR) types of Multiple unit. The knuckle of this coupling could be lowered on a hinge (by removing a locating pin in its shank) to reveal the classic British hook. Over the hook could be coupled a "3 Link" chain coupling, or an "Instanter" chain type, or a "Screwlink" chain type. However, the rigid "Buckeye" type coupling,  because it maintains a fixed distance between vehicles, presents a dangerous problem when buffers are present. The standard British buffer is needed to cope with the variable distance of chain-type couplings, to reduce buffeting and snatching behaviour. But with the shorter rigid Buckeye in use, the buffers cannot compact enough in curves and would derail one or both vehicles. So, buffers on Buckeye fitted vehicles have to be of the "Retractable" type. They are extended when chain type coupling is in use, but retracted out of the way so they cannot touch when the Buckeye is in use. This then presents another problem: how will buffing and snatching be dealt with when the Buckeye is in use? The solution is to move the buffing control to the centre of the vehicle, where the change in angles between vehicle corners is greatly reduced in curves; hence the "Pullman Rubbing Bar" seen between the buffers on Class 73 locos, and Class 33/1 diesels. This flat-looking plate is mounted on two hydraulic rams to act like a buffer. Its shape is actually the floor section of a Pullman Gangway connection as seen on Buckeye fitted coaches (such as Mk1 types) or Multiple units. The Pullman gangway connection, being itself semi-rigid, has a similar two hydraulic rams hidden behind its floor section to do the job of buffing, so it happily matches the Pullman Rubbing Plate in size and shape on the Class 73.

The Class 73/1s were noted being delivered from English Electric's plant at Newton-le-Willows working in Multiple with new Class 20 1,000 hp diesels as these were being built at the same plant concurrently, so only one driver was needed to move both locos under (diesel) power. In normal use the Class 73/1s were often seen working with Bournemouth line electric TC (nonpowered) sets, which allowed such trains to be driven in Push-Pull mode.
Although technically possible, the Class 73/1s were not allowed to work in multiple or tandem with the Bournemouth line 4REP EMUs as this would exceed the "Current Limit Index" (CLI). The CLI is a rating system for all electrically powered stock, and to exceed the maximum permitted can result in sub stations and other electrical equipment being damaged.

Operations

British Rail 

During 1984, a small subfleet of Class 73s were dedicated to work the upgraded Gatwick Express service, which would feature a Class 73 at the southern end, a rake of air-conditioned Mk2f coaches which had been modified to carry Southern Region multiple unit control jumpers, and a Class 489 "GLV" (themselves converted from former Class 414 driving Motor coaches) at the north end.  Both the Class 73 and the GLV provided power, and the trains ran non-stop between London Victoria and Gatwick Airport.

Post-privatisation operations 
Since privatisation, the Class 73 fleet has been reduced in size following the large-scale withdrawals of the EWS and Gatwick Express fleets. However, many smaller operators have acquired locomotives, so their continued use is assured for the foreseeable future.

Eurostar 

Eurostar owned and formerly operated two Class 73 locomotives, which were specially modified to enable them to haul a Eurostar unit. The two locomotives; 73118 and 73130, have additional coupling equipment fitted and were primarily used to rescue failed Eurostar sets, or to haul them over non-electrified routes. They were rarely used away from North Pole depot. When Eurostar moved its operations to the new Temple Mills depot and onto the overhead wiring of High Speed 1 in 2007, the Class 73 locomotives became redundant and were loaned to educational initiatives: 73130 went to RailSchool in East London and 73118 went to Barry Rail Centre in South Wales. Subsequently, when RailSchool failed, 73130 was loaned to the Bluebell Railway but is stored away from the railway. As of 5 November 2022 73130 is now in the hands of the 73130 Ltd based at the Llanelli and Mynydd Mawr Railway in Carmarthenshire.

FM Rail 
FM Rail (previously Fragonset Railways) bought several redundant locomotives from EWS. Most of these were initially stored at various locations around the country, including preservation sites, such as the Mid-Hants Railway, the Peak Railway and the Dartmoor Railway. Some of these locomotives were repaired for use on these heritage railways, such as number 73134 on the Dartmoor Railway.

One locomotive, number 73107 "Spitfire" returned to mainline traffic in 2004 following overhaul. It was repainted in Fragonset's black freight livery, and was expected to be used on empty coaching stock moves associated with charter trains. It was regularly hired to First GBRf from late 2004 as cover for their fleet and was based at c2c's East Ham Depot along with the Blue Pullman Rake. In 2007 it was acquired by RT Rail and has been overhauled and repainted in a GBRf-esque livery at St. Leonards Depot.

Gatwick Express / Southern 

Until mid-2005, Gatwick Express operated several Class 73s with Class 488 coaching stock and Class 489 GLVs. These have now been withdrawn and replaced by EMUs. However, 73202 was retained as a "Thunderbird" engine to rescue failed EMUs.  Along with the rest of the Gatwick Express franchise, it later passed to Southern. The locomotive, formerly "Dave Berry", was renamed "Graham Stenning" after the company's Apprentice Manager, at Brighton Lovers Walk Depot on 11 December 2015.

GB Railfreight 

GB Railfreight is the newest operator of Class 73 locomotives, having bought six redundant Gatwick Express locomotives, numbers 73203-207 and 73209. Four of these (73204-206 and 209) have now been returned to traffic after overhaul by Fragonset at Derby. They have been repainted in the company's blue and orange livery and named after female employees. The locomotives are primarily used on engineering trains originating from Eastleigh and Tonbridge. The former company First GBRf purchased 73208 and repainted it into BR Blue. In early 2009 73207 was repainted in Large Logo Blue and used for shunting duties in Whitemoor Yard. First GBRf also acquired 73141, 73212 and 73213, with all three painted in the new First Group livery; however, 73212 lacks the FirstGroup logo. 73141 was named 'Charlotte' in July 2009, which was known for being named twice in February 2009. Now operated by the Eurotunnel Group, the trains are now being de-branded from the First Group branding. 73119 was purchased from Knights Rail Services in September 2011 and returned to service in June 2012. In 2013, Class 73s 73109 and 73136 were brought by GB Railfreight. They have since been repainted along with First GRBF liveried 73141, 212 and 73213 at St. Leonards Depot into GB Railfreight livery.

Commencing in 2013, five GB Railfreight Class 73s were re-engined as Class 73/9 by Brush Traction Wabtec at their factory in Loughborough. The first three converted locomotives, renumbered 73961-3 from 73209, 73204 and 73206 respectively, were fitted with MTU 1,600 hp V8 engines. All existing mechanical and electrical components were removed prior to the re-fit, and the frontal appearance of the locomotives has been altered by the provision of light clusters and the installation of a more central location for the jumper cables. The dual driving positions have been retained although with a new design for the driver's controls. The refurbished locomotives will be capable of working with existing Class 73/1 and 73/2 units in either diesel or electric mode. The first completed locomotive, 73962 (ex-73204), was unveiled on 3 August 2014 at Brush Traction Loughborough.

GB Railfreight use re-engined Class 73/9 locomotives to haul the Caledonian Sleeper. They are used for the non-electrified sections of the route, running from Edinburgh to Aberdeen, Inverness and Fort William. The first Class 73/9 hauled stock movement for the Caledonian Sleeper contract came when 73966 worked 5B26, the lowland sleeper empties from Edinburgh Waverley to Polmadie.

Merseyrail Electrics 
Merseyrail Electrics had a fleet of four Class 73/0 locomotives (numbers 73 001, 73 002, 73 004*, 73 005 & 73 006), based at Birkenhead North TMD, for use on shunting and other departmental duties. Two, numbers 73001 and 73006, were repainted into Merseyrail's yellow livery; they were later fitted with sandite discharging equipment and reclassified as Class 73/9. All four locomotives were withdrawn from traffic by 2002, and all were later sold for preservation.
 73 004 was used as a source of spare parts and was the first to be cut up.

Network Rail 

Network Rail inherited two redundant Gatwick Express locomotives, numbers 73212 and 73213, from its predecessor Railtrack. These were overhauled and painted in the company's blue and green livery. They are used on engineering trains associated with an upgrade of electrical supply systems on the former Southern Region.

A third locomotive, number 73141, was originally bought for spare parts, but was returned to traffic in case of failure of one of the other two locomotives. The locomotives were later repainted into Network Rail all-over-yellow with red buffer beams.

In 2009, 73141 was acquired by First GBRf, with 73212 and 73213 following shortly afterward.

Two locomotives, numbers 73211 and 73104, were completely rebuilt by Rail Vehicle Engineering Limited (RVEL) of Derby. The 600 hp diesel engine was removed and replaced by a pair of Cummins QSK19 750 hp diesel engines, increasing the total diesel horsepower to 1,500. The locomotives are used by Network Rail and are classified 73/9. The Cummins QSK19 is the same engine used in the Class 220 and Class 221 diesel multiple units. 73101 has been sold from preservation and will be added to the overhaul program. The first prototype of Network Rail's new 'Ultra73' locomotives was unveiled on Friday 13 June 2014 at RVEL in Derby.

RT Rail 
RT Rail acquired loco number 73107 from FM Rail in 2007, and had it overhauled and repainted at St. Leonards Depot.

South Western Railway 
South West Trains inherited one locomotive, number 73109, which is used as a "Thunderbird" rescue locomotive. It was named in 1990 to commemorate the 50th anniversary of the Battle of Britain. It is affectionately known as "BoB" by rail enthusiasts.

South West Trains later expanded its fleet, by leasing two more locomotives from Porterbrook, numbers. 73201 and 73235. Both are former Gatwick Express locomotives. The first of these, number 73235, was overhauled in early 2005 and repainted in the new Desiro blue livery. It was joined by number 73201 later in the same year. Around the same time, number 73109 was also repainted into the new blue livery. 73109 was acquired by Transmart Trains in 2009.

73235 is being used for shunting at Bournemouth Depot since the change of the South Western Railway.

Transmart Trains (formerly The Class 73 Locomotive Preservation Company) 
The Class 73 Locomotive Preservation Company (C73LPC) formed in 2004 to manage locomotive 73136 at Stewarts Lane Depot, London.
73136, the last 73 operated by EWS was renamed "Perseverance", is now fully fitted with TPWS and OTMR equipment following the implementation of OTMR during the summer of 2006. The locomotive is registered for use on the national rail network and is available for either short term 'spot' hire or medium-term contracts. The locomotive was hired to the Bluebell Railway during 2009 to assist with its Northern Extension to East Grinstead. In August 2006, the company was contracted by GBRf to repaint GBRf's 73208 into BR Blue for future use on charter work with 73136. The company has also restored 73210 at Stewarts Lane Depot, this locomotive is privately owned. The locomotive moved to its new home on the Mid Norfolk Railway in September 2008.

The Class 73 Locomotive Preservation Company changed ownership in 2009 and was renamed Transmart Trains in 2010. Following the takeover, the company expanded its operations and managed five Class 73 locomotives. These were 73109, 73118, 73133, 73136 and 73211. Number 73211 had been stripped for spares and is unlikely to return to service in its original form. 73133 has since been sold to a partner group of Transmart, and left Selhurst by road for a new life at Barry Island. Subsequently, the locomotive was transited by rail to South West Trains Bournemouth Depot on long term hire.

In 2013, Class 73s 73109 and 73136 were sold on for further use with GB Railfreight. They have since been repainted along with First GBRf liveried 73141, 73212 and 73213 at St. Leonards Depot into GB Railfreight livery.

Preservation 

Several locomotives have been preserved on heritage railways, where perforce they run on their diesel engines: no preserved line has third rail electrification.

Fleet

Summary

List

Model Railways 
Lima launched its first version of the BR Class 73 in OO gauge in the early 2000s. Since 2006 Hornby have produced a representation of the prototype using the Lima tooling as part of their range in BR Green, whilst past examples have carried a variety of liveries.

See also 
 P32AC-DM A United States locomotive with the same ability.

Notes

References 

Sources

Further reading 

 
 
 

 
 
 
 

Bo-Bo locomotives
73
English Electric locomotives
Vulcan Foundry locomotives
750 V DC locomotives
Electro-diesel locomotives of Great Britain
Railway locomotives introduced in 1962
Standard gauge locomotives of Great Britain